Collyer Quay is a road in Downtown Core, Singapore that starts after Fullerton Road and ends at the junction of Raffles Quay, Finlayson Green and Marina Boulevard. The road houses several landmarks namely, Clifford Pier, Change Alley, Hitachi Tower, Ocean Towers and Ocean Financial Centre.

History 

Until the late 1960s the front of Clifford Pier was a carpark. After office hours the carpark was transformed into a gathering place for musicians, mobile foodstalls and prostitutes. The carpark later made way for road-widening and construction of new developments.

New developments

There are new developments at the water front property along Collyer Quay between Marina Boulevard and One Fullerton. A new waterfront hotel, called the Fullerton Bay Hotel, opened in 2010. The historical buildings, these being Clifford Pier and the former Customs Harbour Branch Building, were incorporated into the new developments. The hotel and the historical buildings are connected to incorporate the Marina Promenade and to allow free pedestrian traffic along Marina Bay. A new office building, OUE Bayfront was also built to replace the former OUE building which stood beside Clifford Pier.

References

Victor R Savage, Brenda S A Yeoh (2004), Toponymics A Study of Singapore Street Names, Eastern University Press, ''

Roads in Singapore